The Virginia National Bank Headquarters Historic District encompasses a skyscraper, parking garage, and public plaza in downtown Norfolk, Virginia.  Bounded by East Main and Atlantic Streets, Commercial Place, and Waterside Drive, it includes the 24-story Virginia National Bank building, constructed in 1965–67 to a design by Skidmore, Owings & Merrill, one of Virginia's leading architectural firms of the period.  The accompanying plaza and garage formed part of the design, and are a significant example of mid-20th century architecture and landscape design principles.  Its construction marked the start of a revitalization and transformation of downtown Norfolk.

In late 2015, plans were announced to convert the building to a 300-unit luxury apartment tower with ground-level retail. The building has been renamed the Icon Norfolk.

The district was listed on the National Register of Historic Places in 2016.

See also

Bank of America Center (Norfolk, Virginia)
National Register of Historic Places listings in Norfolk, Virginia

References

External links
 Icon Norfolk website

Bank buildings on the National Register of Historic Places in Virginia
Buildings and structures in Norfolk, Virginia
National Register of Historic Places in Norfolk, Virginia
Historic districts in Virginia
Office buildings in Norfolk, Virginia
Skyscraper office buildings in Norfolk, Virginia
Office buildings completed in 1967
Skidmore, Owings & Merrill buildings
Bank of America buildings
Downtown Norfolk, Virginia